John Gartner may refer to:
 John Gartner (philatelist), Australian philatelist
 John Gartner (psychologist), American psychologist